Carl E. Banks (born August 29, 1962) is an American former professional football player who was a linebacker in the National Football League (NFL). He played from 1984 to 1995 for the New York Giants, the Washington Redskins and the Cleveland Browns. He played college football for the Michigan State Spartans.

Career
Banks played high school football at Beecher High School, graduating in 1980. He made the Pro Bowl in 1987, had 39.5 career quarterback sacks, and was a member of the NFL's 1980's All-Decade Team. He played college football at Michigan State University and was the third overall pick in the 1984 NFL Draft. He was a member of the Giants teams that won Super Bowls XXI and XXV as well as a key part of the Big Blue Wrecking Crew. Banks was a standout in their Super Bowl XXI victory in which he recorded 14 total tackles, including ten solo tackles. In 1993, Banks entered a three-year contract to play for the Washington Redskins. He was released from the Redskins after the 1993 season and spent his final two years with the Cleveland Browns before retiring after the 1995 season.

Post-football career
After retiring from the NFL, Banks was a part-owner of the Arena Football League's New Jersey Red Dogs, along with ex-Giants Joe Morris and Harry Carson. He was Director of Player Development for the New York Jets in 1997. Currently, Banks can be heard as one of the voices of Sirius NFL Radio and WFAN. Starting in 2007, he became an analyst for the radio broadcasts of the New York Giants.

See also
 History of the New York Giants (1979–93)

References

External links

1962 births
Living people
African-American players of American football
American football linebackers
Arena Football League executives
Cleveland Browns players
Michigan State Spartans football players
National Conference Pro Bowl players
National Football League announcers
New York Giants announcers
New York Giants players
People from Watchung, New Jersey
Players of American football from Flint, Michigan
Sportspeople from Somerset County, New Jersey
Washington Redskins players
21st-century African-American people
20th-century African-American sportspeople
Ed Block Courage Award recipients